In mathematics, the Markov brothers' inequality is an inequality proved in the 1890s by brothers Andrey Markov and Vladimir Markov, two Russian mathematicians. This inequality bounds the maximum of the derivatives of a polynomial on an interval in terms of the maximum of the polynomial. For k = 1 it was proved by Andrey Markov, and for k = 2,3,... by his brother Vladimir Markov.

The statement
Let P be a polynomial of degree ≤ n.  Then for all nonnegative integers 

 

Equality is attained for Chebyshev polynomials of the first kind.

Related inequalities
 Bernstein's inequality (mathematical analysis)
 Remez inequality

Applications
Markov's inequality is used to obtain lower bounds in computational complexity theory via the so-called "Polynomial Method".

References

Theorems in analysis
Inequalities